Caroline Peters (born 1971, Mainz) is a German actress. She played Pia Himmelman in the 2004 Israeli film Walk on Water.

Filmography
  (2022, Film) as Elisabeth Berger-Böttcher
 Dreiraumwohnung (2021, Film) as Dr. Marit Miebach
 Südpol (2019, TV Film) as Sandra Wallentin
  (2018, Film) as Elisabeth Berger-Böttcher
 Womit haben wir das verdient? (2018, Film) as Wanda
 Zweibettzimmer (2017, Film) as Dr. Marit Miebach
 Kalt ist die Angst (2017, TV film) as Claire Heller
  (2016, Film) as Frau Morian
 Ein Mord mit Aussicht (2015, TV film) as Sophie Haas
 Im Netz (2013, Film) as Juliane Schubert
  (2009, TV film) as Yvonne Sagmeister
  (2009, TV film) as Eva Lorenz
 Mord mit Aussicht (TV series, 2008-2014) as Sophie Haas
 Contergan - Eine einzige Tablette (2007, TV film) as Hanne Bauer
 November Sonne (2006)
 Arnies Welt (2005, TV film) as Hannah Bäumer
 Stromberg (TV series, 1 episode, 2005) as Kerstin Aumann
 Polizeiruf 110 (TV series, 1 episode, 2005)
 Wilsberg (TV series, 1 episode, 2005) as Susanne Diepenbrock
 Die Ärztin (2004, TV film) as Jutta Peters
 Walk on Water (2004) as Pia Himmelman
 Schöne Frauen (2004) as Kandis Zuckermann
 Tatort (TV series, 1 episode, 2003) as Katharina Stoll
 Über Nacht (2003)
 Die Affäre Semmeling (2002, TV mini-series) 
 99euro-films (segment So billig, 2001)
 Schluss mit lustig! (2001, TV film) as Connie
 Im Namen des Gesetzes (TV series, 1 episode, 1999) as Maria Schneller
 Der Pirat (1998, TV film)
 Fake Soldiers (1999) as herself

Awards
 2007: Won the Adolf Grimme Award for Arnies Welt (2005, German TV)

External links
 

1971 births
Living people
German film actresses
German television actresses
Actors from Mainz